The Check Clearing for the 21st Century Act (or Check 21 Act) is a United States federal law, that was enacted on October 28, 2003 by the 108th U.S. Congress. The Check 21 Act took effect one year later on October 28, 2004. The law allows the recipient of the original paper check to create a digital version of the original check, a process known as check truncation, into an electronic format called a "substitute check", thereby eliminating the need for further handling of the physical document. In essence, the recipient bank no longer returns the paper check, but effectively e-mails an image of both sides of the check to the bank it is drawn upon. 

Consumers are most likely to see the effects of this act when they notice that certain checks (or images thereof) are no longer being returned to them with their monthly statement, even though other checks are still being returned. Another effect of the law is that it is now legal for anyone to use a computer scanner or mobile phone to capture images of checks and deposit them electronically, a process known as remote deposit.

Check 21 is not subject to ACH rules; therefore transactions are not subject to NACHA (The Electronic Payments Association) rules, regulations, fees and fines.

Truncation 

The Act lets banks take advantage of image technologies and electronic transport while not being dependent on other banks being ready to settle transactions with images instead of paper. The process of removing the paper check from its processing flow is called "check truncation". In truncation, both sides of the paper check are scanned to produce a digital image. If a paper document is still needed, these images are inserted into specially formatted documents containing a photo-reduced copy of the original checks called a "substitute check".

Once a check is truncated, businesses and banks can work with either the digital image or a print reproduction of it. Images can be exchanged between member banks, savings and loans, credit unions, servicers, clearinghouses, and the Federal Reserve Bank.

Effects and developments

Remote deposit

Patents

There are a number of patents relating to "check back collection systems", including some owned by DataTreasury.

See also

Remote deposit

Substitute check in United States

References

External links
 Full Text of the Check 21 Act
 "Accredited Standards Committee (ASC) X9 Financial Industry Standards: Statement on Check 21 adoption (October 23, 2004)". Accredited Standards Committee X9. Archived from the original on December 24, 2008.
 "Check 21 Return Codes". Vericheck. Archived from the original on March 15, 2017.

Federal Reserve System
Negotiable instrument law
United States federal banking legislation
United States federal criminal legislation
Acts of the 108th United States Congress
Cheques